Mosel Vitelic was a company that produced integrated circuits for memory. It started in 1985 and made DRAM and Flash memory. They used a .12u/.14u process and manufacture 128Mb/256Mb SDR, DDR RAM and 256Mb/512Mb DDR2 RAM.

Around May 2009, the company closed its doors due to the lack of funding from parent corporation Mosel Vitelic Inc.

References

External links
Official Mosel Vitelic Corporation website

Defunct semiconductor companies of the United States
Fabless semiconductor companies
Technology companies based in the San Francisco Bay Area
Companies based in San Jose, California
Electronics companies established in 1985
Technology companies established in 1985
Technology companies disestablished in 2009
1985 establishments in California
2009 disestablishments in California
Defunct companies based in the San Francisco Bay Area